Martinville may refer to:

Martinville, Ontario or Oro-Medonte, township in south-central Ontario, Canada
Martinville, Quebec, municipality within the Coaticook Regional County Municipality of Quebec, Canada
St. Martinville, Louisiana, city in, and the parish seat of, St. Martin Parish, Louisiana, United States
Édouard-Léon Scott de Martinville (1817–1879), French printer and bookseller who lived in Paris

See also
Martainneville
Martainville (disambiguation)
Martinsville (disambiguation)